

Events
Australian television celebrates its 40th birthday with celebrations lasting throughout the year. The actual birthday was on 16 September.
Jessica Rowe joins Ten News Sydney in January to co-anchor with Ron Wilson for the next nine years.
1 January – To celebrate the start of the new year, ABC-TV debuts a series of new idents featuring people doing various activities using inspiration and fun. As they do so, they draw the ABC's famous worm logo. The logo then fades before the video fades to black and the words "it's your abc" appear.
5 February – American legal drama series JAG makes its debut on the Seven Network at 7:30 pm.
12 February - Midday With Kerri-Anne begins on Nine Network at 12:00 pm. It marks the return of the traditional variety format to the Midday brand, with Kerri-Anne Kennerley taking over from last year's co-hosts Tracy Grimshaw and David Reyne.
12 February – More tributes to Hey Hey It's Saturday'''s talent quest Red Faces continue with The Best and Worst of Red Faces No. 7 on Nine Network at 7:30 pm featuring more classic acts prior to 1995.
12 February – Nine Network's new Australian police drama Water Rats debuts at 8:30 pm with a two-hour episode starring Colin Friels, Catherine McClements, Sophie Heathcote and Aaron Jeffery.
16 February – A brand new state-based news and currents affairs program titled Stateline premieres on ABC at 6:00 pm and was shown every Friday evening. The show focus on issues concerning different states of Australia.
19 February – Australia's favourite koala Blinky Bill returns to the ABC for a brand new series titled Blinky Bill's Extraordinary Excursion at 4:30 pm. The series follows the adventures of Blinky and the gang who were lost while on an excursion and helping other animals in a situation while trying to find their way back to Greenpatch.
18 March – 40 Years of Television airs on the Seven Network, hosted by entertainers Garry McDonald and Magda Szubanski.
20 March – American sitcom 3rd Rock from the Sun debuts on the Seven Network.
April – Constable Wayne Patterson, portrayed by Grant Bowler, is killed in a car crash on the Blue Heelers episode An Act of Random Violence. Bowler departed the series.
3 April – The Ferals return to the ABC with a five-minute sequel series titled Feral TV at 5:25pm. The series also introduces new characters such as Kerry the Cane Toad and Rodney the Cockroach and follows the mischievous animals and their mishaps at a pirate television station.
13 May - WIN Television reintroduces its Albury Local News Bulletin nine months after it was axed.
16 May – DIC's Sailor Moon premiered on the Seven Network as part of Agro's Cartoon Connection.
June – Liz Hayes quits the Today Show after 11 years and joins the 60 Minutes team, Tracy Grimshaw replaces Hayes on Today to co-host for the next nine years before leading up to A Current Affair from 2006 onwards.
3 June – Australian children's comedy series The Genie from Down Under a co-production between ACTF, the ABC (Australia) and the BBC (UK) begins screening on ABC every Monday at 5:00 pm.
17 June – Iconic British 1970s sitcom Fawlty Towers returns to air on the ABC again after being shown on commercial free for air television on Seven Network.
12 July – After 12 years John Burgess retires as host of Wheel of Fortune. The following Monday, former Sale of the Century quizmaster, Tony Barber returns to TV and begins hosting a failed run which lasts for the remainder of the year. WOF relocates from Adelaide to Sydney during this time. Wheel of Fortune was nearly cancelled at the end of 1996 after dismal ratings, but the show continued its long run instead.
18 July – Australian long running children's television series Play School celebrates its 30th birthday with a one-hour special on ABC at 4:00 pm.
30 July – British sitcom Father Ted premieres on the Nine Network.
August – After a stand-off over who would air the show first with Seven owning the rights to the first season and Nine the subsequent seasons, despite Seven not renewing the Warner Bros. output deal, the first season of Friends screens on the Seven Network, almost two years after it premiered in the United States. Season two begins on the Nine Network in December.
15 August - In Neighbours, Karl Kennedy's surgery explodes.
14 September - Sale Of The Century begins its 40 years of television celebrity challenge special, then at 8.30pm the two hour special 40 Years Of Television — The Reel History goes to air on the Nine Network.
18 September - The Nine Network at 8.30pm airs another 40th Anniversary tribute special to Australian Television 40 Years Of Television — Then And Now, presented by Don Lane.
19 September – 1.9 million watch Kerri-Anne Kennerley and treasurer Peter Costello dancing the "Macarena" live on the Midday Show.
27 September - In Neighbours, Cheryl Stark dies.
17 November – The 1993 film Jurassic Park premieres on the Seven Network.
22 November - After a short live run in its 1.00pm timeslot, Reruns of Australian classic TV drama favourite Prisoner air for the last time on Network Ten. The following January, the Seven Network picked up the soap, which still airs all 692 episodes of reruns to this present day.
1 December – Grant Piro presents the final episode of Couch Potato for 1996 on ABC with reruns of the Australian children's educational TV series Lift Off and the American children's mystery TV series Ghostwriter. This also marks his very last day as presenter of the series since 1991.
10 December – Final episode of the Australian drama series G.P. screens on ABC.
The original 1987 Teenage Mutant Ninja Turtles cartoon series airs on Australian television for the very last time on the Seven Network. It didn't return to air in Australia until the early 2010s where it was then aired on Network Ten's sister digital network Eleven.

New channels
 8 June – Disney Channel
 14 June – ARC Music TV
 30 June – The Comedy Channel
 2 August – Nightmoves

Debuts
Domestic

International

Changes to network affiliation
This is a list of programs which made their premiere on an Australian television network that had previously premiered on another Australian television network. The networks involved in the switch of allegiances are predominantly both free-to-air networks or both subscription television networks. Programs that have their free-to-air/subscription television premiere, after previously premiering on the opposite platform (free-to air to subscription/subscription to free-to air) are not included. In some cases, programs may still air on the original television network. This occurs predominantly with programs shared between subscription television networks.

Domestic

International

Subscription premieres
This is a list of programs which made their premiere on Australian subscription television that had previously premiered on Australian free-to-air television. Programs may still air on the original free-to-air television network.

Domestic

International

Changes to network affiliation
This is a list of programs which made their premiere on an Australian television network that had premiered on another Australian television network. The networks involved in the switch of allegiances are predominantly both free-to-air networks or both subscription television networks. Programs that have their free-to-air/subscription television premiere, after  having premiered on the opposite platform (free-to air to subscription/subscription to free-to air) are not included. In some cases, programs may still air on the original television network. This occurs predominantly with programs shared between subscription television networks.

International

Television shows
ABC TV
 Mr. Squiggle and Friends (1959–1999)
 Four Corners (1961–present)
 Rage (1987–beyond)
 G.P. (1989–1996)
 Foreign Correspondent (1992–present)
 Frontline (1994–1997)

Seven Network
 Wheel of Fortune (1981–1996, 1996–2003, 2004-beyond)
 A Country Practice (1981–1994)
 Home and Away (1988–present)
 Family Feud (1988–1996)
 The Great Outdoors (1993–2006, 2007)
 Full Frontal (1993–present)
 Blue Heelers (1994–2006)

Nine Network
 Sunday (1981–2008)
 Today (1982–present)
 Sale of the Century (1980–2001)
 A Current Affair (1971–1978, 1988–2005, 2006–present)
 Hey Hey It's Saturday (1971–1999)
 The Midday Show (1973–1998)
 60 Minutes (1979–present)
 The Flying Doctors (1986–1991)
 Australia's Funniest Home Video Show (1990–2000, 2000–2004, 2005–present)
 Hey Hey It's Saturday (1971–1999)
 Getaway (1992–present)
 Our House (1993–2001)
 Money (1993–2000)

Network Ten
 Neighbours (1985–present)
 E Street (1989–1993)
 Good Morning Australia with Bert Newton (1991–2005)
 Sports Tonight'' (1993–2011)

Ending this year

See also 
 1996 in Australia
 List of Australian films of 1996

References